The men's sprint was a cycling event held at the 1968 Summer Olympics in Mexico City, Mexico, held on 18 to 19 October 1968. There were 47 participants from 28 nations. Each nation was limited to two cyclists. The event was won by Daniel Morelon of France, his second consecutive medal and first gold; it was also France's world-leading sixth victory in the men's sprint. His countryman Pierre Trentin, who had lost the bronze medal match to Morelon four years earlier, this year won it against Omar Pkhakadze of the Soviet Union. Between the French cyclists was silver medalist Giordano Turrini of Italy, extending that nation's streak of top-two results in the event to six Games.

Background

This was the 14th appearance of the event, which has been held at every Summer Olympics except 1904 and 1912. The only two quarterfinalists from 1964 to return were the French cyclists: Pierre Trentin and Daniel Morelon. Trentin had been favored in 1964, but both had lost in the semifinals and Morelon had won the bronze medal match between them. Morelon would beat Trentin again at the 1966 and 1967 World Championship finals and the 1968 Grand Prix de Paris, though Trentin would prevail in the 1964, 1965, and 1967 Grand Prix competitions. Coming into Mexico City, Morelon was favored with Trentin expected to challenge him in the final. Also contending were 1965 World Champion Omar Phakadze of the Soviet Union and runner-up Giordano Turrini of Italy, as well as 1968 runner-up Niels Fredborg of Denmark.

Barbados, Belize, Lebanon, the Philippines, Puerto Rico, South Korea, and Thailand each made their debut in the men's sprint; West Germany competed separately for the first time. France made its 14th appearance, the only nation to have competed at every appearance of the event.

Competition format

This sprint competition involved a series of head-to-head matches. The 1968 competition involved ten rounds: six main rounds (first round, second round, 1/8 finals, quarterfinals, semifinals, and finals) as well as three repechages after the first three main rounds; the third repechage was a two-round repechage.

 First round: The 51 entrants were divided into 17 heats of 3 cyclists each. Withdrawals left some heats with only 2 competitors. The winner of each heat advanced directly to the second round (17 cyclists), while all other cyclists who competed were sent to the first repechage (30 cyclists).
 First repechage: The 30 cyclists were divided into 12 heats, each with 2 or 3 cyclists. The winner of each heat advanced to the second round (12 cyclists), while all others were eliminated (18 cyclists, including those who did not start).
 Second round: The 29 cyclists who advanced through the first round or first repechage were divided into 10 heats; all heats had 3 cyclists except heat 1, which had only 2. The winner of each heat advanced directly to the third round, the 1/8 finals (10 cyclists), while all others went to the second repechage (19 cyclists).
 Second repechage: The 19 cyclists from the second round were divided into 8 heats, with 2 or 3 cyclists per heat. Winners advanced to the 1/8 finals (8 cyclists), while all others were eliminated (11 cyclists, including those who did not start).
 1/8 finals: The 18 cyclists who advanced through the first two rounds (including repechages) competed in a 1/8 finals round. There were 6 heats in this round, with 3 cyclists in each. The top cyclist in each heat advanced to the quarterfinals (6 cyclists), while the other 2 in each heat went to the third repechage (12 cyclists).
 Third repechage: This was a two-round repechage. The repechage began with 4 heats of 3 cyclists each. The top cyclist in each heat advanced to the second round, while the other 2 cyclists in each heat were eliminated. The second round of this repechage featured 2 heats of 2 cyclists each, with the winners advancing to the quarterfinals and the losers eliminated.
 Quarterfinals: Beginning with the quarterfinals, all matches were one-on-one competitions and were held in best-of-three format. There were 4 quarterfinals, with the winner of each advancing to the semifinals and the loser eliminated.
 Semifinals: The two semifinals provided for advancement to the gold medal final for winners and to the bronze medal final for losers.
 Finals: Both a gold medal final and a bronze medal final were held.

Records

The records for the sprint are 200 metre flying time trial records, kept for the qualifying round in later Games as well as for the finish of races.

Jan Jansen matched the Olympic record at 11.10 seconds for the last 200 metres in the eighth heat of round 1. Dino Verzini set a new record of 10.87 seconds in the next heat. Roger Gibbon pushed the record to 10.70 seconds in the fifth heat of round 2. Leijn Loevesijn's time of 10.66 seconds in the second heat of the third repechage semifinals was the last record-breaking performance of the event.

Schedule

All times are Central Standard Time (UTC-6)

Results

First round

First round heat 1

First round heat 2

First round heat 3

First round heat 4

First round heat 5

Jürgen Kissner of West Germany was entered in this heat but did not compete.

First round heat 6

First round heat 7

George Artin of Iraq was entered in this heat but did not compete.

First round heat 8

Constantin Kabemba of the Cook Islands was entered in this heat but did not compete.

First round heat 9

First round heat 10

First round heat 11

First round heat 12

First round heat 13

Ignace Mandjambi of the Cook Islands was entered in this heat but did not compete.

First round heat 14

First round heat 15

First round heat 16

First round heat 17

First repechage

Tarek Abou Al Dahab of Lebanon withdrew.

First repechage heat 1

First repechage heat 2

First repechage heat 3

First repechage heat 4

First repechage heat 5

First repechage heat 6

First repechage heat 7

First repechage heat 8

First repechage heat 9

First repechage heat 10

First repechage heat 11

First repechage heat 12

Second round

Second round heat 1

Second round heat 2

Second round heat 3

Second round heat 4

Second round heat 5

Second round heat 6

Second round heat 7

Second round heat 8

Second round heat 9

Second round heat 10

Second repechage

Second repechage heat 1

Second repechage heat 2

Second repechage heat 3

Second repechage heat 4

Second repechage heat 5

Second repechage heat 6

Second repechage heat 7

Second repechage heat 8

1/8 finals

1/8 final 1

1/8 final 2

1/8 final 3

1/8 final 4

1/8 final 5

1/8 final 6

Third repechage heats

Third repechage heat 1

Third repechage heat 2

Third repechage heat 3

Third repechage heat 4

Third repechage finals

Third repechage final 1

Third repechage final 2

Quarterfinals

Quarterfinal 1

Quarterfinal 2

Quarterfinal 3

Quarterfinal 4

Semifinals

Semifinal 1

Semifinal 2

Finals

Bronze medal match

Final

Final classification

References

Cycling at the 1968 Summer Olympics
Cycling at the Summer Olympics – Men's sprint
Track cycling at the 1968 Summer Olympics